Cyclidia diehli is a moth in the family Drepanidae. It was described by Lutz W. R. Kobes in 2002. It is found on Sumatra.

References

Moths described in 2002
Cyclidiinae